The women's 20 kilometres walk event at the 2019 European Athletics U23 Championships was held in Gävle, Sweden on 14 July.

Results

Penalties:
~ Lost contact
> Bent knee

References

2019 European Athletics U23 Championships
Racewalking at the European Athletics U23 Championships